Turridrupa albogemmata is a species of sea snail, a marine gastropod mollusk in the family Turridae, the turrids.

Description
The length of the shell attains 11.9 mm.

Distribution
This marine species occurs off Mactan Island, Philippines.

References

 Stahlschmidt P. & Fraussen K. (2011) Two new species of Turridrupa from the Philippines (Gastropoda: Turridae: Turrinae). Miscellanea Malacologica 5(1): 17-21.

External links

albogemmata
Gastropods described in 2011